Glider may refer to:

Aircraft and transport

Aircraft
 Glider (aircraft), heavier-than-air aircraft primarily intended for unpowered flight
 Glider (sailplane), a rigid-winged glider aircraft with an undercarriage, used in the sport of gliding
 Military glider, used to transport combat troops and equipment to a combat zone
 Motor glider, a glider with a power source to generate thrust
 Hang glider, foot-launched, framed fabric wing, usually used for recreation
 Paraglider, foot-launched, unframed fabric wing, usually used for recreation
 Rocket glider, a rocket propelled aircraft that routinely lands as a glider
 Walkalong glider, a model glider with updraft generated by a person walking behind
 Paper glider, a model or toy glider made out of paper
 Gimli Glider, an Air Canada 767 which glided to a successful landing after running out of fuel in 1983

Other transport
 Glider (automobiles), a vehicle without a powertrain
 Glider (Belfast), a bus rapid transit system in Belfast, Northern Ireland
 Underwater glider, a submarine propelled by changing buoyancy

Animals
 There are at least eight marsupial mammals with the name "glider". They are in two families within the suborder Phalangeriformes
 Greater glider, Petauroides volans
 Feathertail glider or pygmy gliding possum, Acrobates pygmaeus
 Biak glider, Petaurus biacensis
 Mahogany glider, Petaurus gracilis
 Northern glider, Petaurus abidi
 Squirrel glider, Petaurus norfolcensis
 Sugar glider, Petaurus breviceps
 Yellow-bellied glider or fluffy glider, Petaurus australis

Computing and video games
 Glider (bot), an Internet bot for automating World of Warcraft gameplay
 Glider (Conway's Life), a pattern in Conway's Game of Life, also used as a hacker emblem
 Glider (video game), a 1988 Apple Macintosh game by John Calhoun

Music
 Glider (band), a band featuring members of Counting Crows
 Glider (The Sight Below album), 2008
 Glider (Tokio album) or the title song, 2003
 Glider (EP) or the title song, by My Bloody Valentine, 1990
 "Glider" (Boyfriend song), 2016
 "Glider", a song by Tycho from Epoch, 2016

Other uses
 Glider (furniture), a type of swinging seat
 Gliders (Elfquest), a fictional tribe of elves in the comic book series Elfquest
 Australia women's national wheelchair basketball team, nicknamed the Gliders

See also
 Glide (disambiguation)
 Gliding (disambiguation)
 Flying and gliding animals